This topic covers notable events and articles related to 2009 in music.

Specific locations
2009 in American music
2009 in Australian music
2009 in British music
2009 in Canadian music
2009 in European music (Continental Europe)
2009 in Irish music
2009 in Japanese music
2009 in New Zealand music
2009 in Norwegian music
2009 in South Korean music

Specific genres 
2009 in rock music
2009 in classical music
2009 in country music
2009 in electro pop music
2009 in heavy metal music
2009 in hip hop music
2009 in Latin music
2009 in jazz
2009 in opera

Events

January

January 8 – Lady Gaga's debut single "Just Dance" hit number one on the Billboard Hot 100 after 22 weeks – the second longest climb to number one, since the Creed single, "With Arms Wide Open", in November 2000 (27 weeks). Just Dance also reaches number 1 on the UK Singles Chart three days later, a week after it debuted at number 3.
January 16–February 1 – The Big Day Out festival takes place in Australia and New Zealand, headlined by Neil Young, The Shiny Brights, The Prodigy and Arctic Monkeys. The Vines, who are originally on the lineup, cancel all appearances due to concerns around frontman Craig Nicholls' mental health.
January 17 – Koncerthuset, the Copenhagen Concert Hall, opens.
January 18 – As part of the inaugural celebration of US President Barack Obama, an inaugural concert entitled "We Are One" is held at the Lincoln Memorial.  Performers include Mary J. Blige, Garth Brooks, Renée Fleming, Caleb Green, Josh Groban, Herbie Hancock, Heather Headley, Beyoncé Knowles, Bettye LaVette, Pete Seeger, Shakira, Bruce Springsteen, James Taylor, U2 and Stevie Wonder.  Several of the songs performed had been used by Obama's presidential campaign.
January 20 
Reel Big Fish published the album Fame, Fortune and Fornication (all Cover songs)
Artists including Mariah Carey, Jay-Z, Alicia Keys, Shakira, Sting, Faith Hill, Mary J. Blige, Maroon 5, Stevie Wonder and Will.i.am performed at the Inaugural Ball for President Barack Obama
January 28 – Kelly Clarkson breaks record for the biggest jump to number-one on the Billboard Hot 100 when her single "My Life Would Suck Without You" soars from number 97 to number one fueled by 280,000 digital downloads in the first week of release.
January 29 – Madonna announces that she will extend her record-breaking Sticky & Sweet Tour during summer 2009, to visit cities that were excluded during the first run. The tour kicked off at The O2 in London on July 4. The extension took the Sticky & Sweet Tour to a total of over 80 shows, putting it among the top five tours of all time.

February
February 1 
At Super Bowl XLIII, Faith Hill and Jennifer Hudson perform at the pregame show and Bruce Springsteen at the halftime show.
Lily Allen's "The Fear" jumps 168 spots to reach the number one spot on the UK Singles Chart, ending Lady Gaga's three-week reign at the top.
February 8 
At the 51st Grammy Awards which took place at the Staples Center, Los Angeles:
Alison Krauss and Robert Plant win five Grammys for their duet album Raising Sand which also won Album of the Year
Lil Wayne wins four awards, including Best Rap Album for Tha Carter III.
Coldplay wins three awards including Song of the Year for Viva La Vida.
Adele wins two awards including Best New Artist.
Blink-182 announce that they are to reunite for a tour and new album.
February 10 – Rihanna cancels her Malaysian concert in the Good Girl Gone Bad Tour amid reports that she accused her boyfriend R&B star Chris Brown of assault. Organizers had announced that she would shun skimpy outfits to conform with Muslim-majority Malaysia's strict rule on performers' dress.
February 12
"Crack a Bottle", performed by Eminem, Dr. Dre and 50 Cent, sets a new record for opening week download sales in the United States, at 418,000 copies. The previous record (335,000) was set by "Live Your Life".
Billboard announces that Madonna is the highest-earning entertainer of 2008, with US$242,176,466, mostly from her sold-out Sticky & Sweet Tour.
February 13 – Drake releases third official mixtape So Far Gone, which receives universal acclaim. Goes on to become recognized as one of the best modern mixtapes and Drake's launch into mainstream success.
February 18
 Pet Shop Boys win the outstanding contribution to music award at the Brit Awards.
 Duffy dominates the Brit Awards, held in Earl's Court, London. Her album, Rockferry, the U.K. top seller in 2008, won best British album, and she also won best British female and British breakthrough
 Kings of Leon (best international group) also win best international album for Only By The Night.
 Katy Perry wins best international female trophy.
 Flo Rida breaks his own record when his single "Right Round" is downloaded 636,000 units in the opening week. His 2008 chart-topper "Low" set the previous record for most downloaded song with 467,000 units sold in the first week of release.
February 24 – Lamb of God album Wrath debuts at number 2 on the Billboard 200, making it the highest charting extreme metal album in the last fifteen years.
February 26 – Vocalist Steven Page leaves the Barenaked Ladies.

March
March 2 – Elton John and Billy Joel The tour dates are mostly configured for 360-degree view in order to maximize arena capacity. The duo's last tour, in 2003, grossed $USD 45.8 million from only 24 sellouts according to Billboard Boxscore.
March 3 – Britney Spears launches her world tour at New Orleans Arena in New Orleans, Louisiana. The 97-show tour was her first world tour in five years, and her first tour since her public breakdown.
March 5 – Michael Jackson announces his last concert series, This Is It to be held at the O2 Arena. The concerts are never held due to Jackson's death three months later
March 6–8 – Phish's reunion shows at Hampton Coliseum in Virginia.
March 10 – Infernus win the Gorgoroth name dispute.
March 11 – Tickets started Selling for Michael Jackson's This Is It tour, 10 shows extended to 50 shows and impressively all 50 dated sold out in under four hours making them the fastest selling concerts ever in history.
March 12 – Electroclash singer Miss Kittin reunites with The Hacker to release the duet album Two.
March 13–22 – The 2009 South by Southwest Conference and Festival.
 Fleetwood Mac embark on their first world tour in five years, with a possible new studio album to follow.
March 22 – Lady Gaga's single "Poker Face" gives her a second number 1 on the UK Singles Chart, remaining there for a further two weeks. It goes on to become the biggest-selling single of 2009 and the biggest-selling digital single ever in the UK.
March 23 — Lady Gaga released a single from “The Fame”, called “LoveGame}”, which becomes the third single of the album.
March 27 – Rapper T.I. is sentenced to a one-year and one day prison sentence on federal weapons charges.

April
April 1 – Lady Gaga becomes the first artist since Christina Aguilera in 1999/2000 to reach the top of the Billboard Hot 100 with their first two chart entries ("Just Dance" and "Poker Face").
April 4 
Ringo Starr and Paul McCartney perform together (for the first time since 2002) at the Radio City Music Hall for the David Lynch Foundation.
The 2009 Rock and Roll Hall of Fame induction ceremony takes place, welcoming new inductees Little Anthony & The Imperials, Bobby Womack, Jeff Beck as a solo artist, Run-D.M.C., and Metallica. Metallica, citing the drama surrounding Blondie, Black Sabbath, and Van Halen's inductions, includes Cliff Burton and Jason Newsted both former bassists for the band in the induction. Newsted also performs with band in its first rendition as a 5-piece band featuring two bass guitarists.
April 5 – Carrie Underwood wins the ACM Entertainer of the Year award, becoming only the 7th female to do so in the history of the ceremony's 44 years.
April 11 – Susan Boyle's version of the song "I Dreamed a Dream" from the musical Les Misérables on Britain's Got Talent becomes a worldwide sensation, as it is seen over 200 million times on YouTube and other video outlets.
April 12 – Carrie Underwood's song "I Told You So" from her album Carnival Ride topped the country songs chart as her tenth straight number one and became the only country artist in history to have their first 10 singles hit number one off their first two albums.
April 13 – Music producer Phil Spector is found guilty of the 2003 murder of actress Lana Clarkson; Spector, who was acclaimed for his Wall of Sound production techniques, was sentenced to 19 years imprisonment the following month. He later died in prison in January, 2021.
April 17–19 – Coachella 2009
April 21 – Heavy metal band Iron Maiden releases a motion picture documentary of their current Somewhere Back in Time World Tour, titled Flight 666.
April 26 – UK grime rapper Tinchy Stryder's collaboration with N-Dubz, "Number 1", goes to the No.1 spot, shifting 72,000 copies in its first week. Stryder's single was the only ever song entitled "Number One" to reach the No.1 spot – even though there have been 23 other songs with the same name.
April 28 – A side project by Burton C. Bell & Dino Cazares from weeks prior changes into Fear Factory rehiring Dino and hiring Gene Hoglan.

May
May 2-3 – The Bamboozle festival in East Rutherford, New Jersey.
May 3 – A concert at Madison Square Garden to celebrate the 90th birthday of Pete Seeger features Bruce Springsteen, Joan Baez, Roger McGuinn, Dave Matthews and Eddie Vedder amongst others.
May 12 – Lin-Manuel Miranda with Alex Lacamoire perform a rap about Alexander Hamilton at a White House Evening of Poetry, Music and the Spoken Word in Washington, D.C., origin of the musical Hamilton.
May 14 – Blink-182 perform their first live performance since December 2004, which was two months before their indefinite hiatus in February 2005.
May 16 – Alexander Rybak wins the Eurovision Song Contest 2009 with his song "Fairytale" in Moscow, giving Norway its third victory. Within a couple of days, the song reaches the top ten in charts in most of Europe, including a No. 10 entry in the UK Singles Chart.
May 18
Rapper Dolla is shot and killed in Beverly Hills, California at the Beverly Center.
Shock rocker Marilyn Manson reunites with Twiggy Ramirez to release Marilyn Manson's album The High End of Low.
Canadian pop/R&B singer Justin Bieber released his debut single One Time (Justin Bieber song)" 
May 19 – Eminem returns with a brand new album titled Relapse which reaches No. 1 on the worldwide chart selling over a million copies in just one week.
May 20 – Kris Allen defeats Adam Lambert to win the eighth season of American Idol.

June
June 1 
The Puerto Rican pop singer Ricky Martin announced he was working on a new studio album and first book.
Pearl Jam are first musical guests on The Tonight Show with Conan O'Brien, performing new songs.
June 4-7
Wakarusa 2009.
Oasis begins the summer stadium leg of their world tour with 3 sold-out homecoming concerts at the 70,000 capacity Heaton Park.
Nephew releases their fourth studio album, Danmark/Denmark.
Phish start their first tour since their "break up" in 2004.
June 11-14 – Bonnaroo 2009.
June 12-14 – The annual Download Festival takes place at Donington Park in Leicestershire, England. The main stage was headlined by Faith No More, Slipknot and Def Leppard, the second stage by Mötley Crüe, The Prodigy and Trivium, the Tuborg stage by Meshuggah, Anvil and Go:Audio, and the Red Bull Bedroom Jam stage by Blackhole, The Blackout and We Are the Ocean.
June 13 – Men At Work are sued by Larrikin Records for their No. 1 1982 Billboard hit "Down Under" for the flute riff from a part of the song. It was claimed to be stolen from an Australian nursery song "Kookaburra".
June 23 – Dream Theater release their last album with Mike Portnoy, Black Clouds & Silver LiningsJune 24-28 – Glastonbury Festival 2009
June 25 
Summerfest begins; the event lasts until July 5.
Roughly two weeks before his This Is It series of concerts is scheduled to begin, Michael Jackson dies in his Los Angeles home of an accidental overdose of propofil and benzodiazepines, later discovered to be the result of medical malpractice by his personal physician, Conrad Murray. The American music icon's passing triggers a surge in posthumous sales making him the best selling artist of the year, with 35 million albums sold worldwide in the months following his death.
June 30 – The U2 360° Tour begins in Barcelona's Camp Nou Stadium in front of a sell out crowd.

July
July 2-3 – Blur's 20-year reunion and superconcert at Hyde Park.
July 2-5 – Heineken Open'er Festival in Gdynia, Poland
July 3 – Yahoo! Music announces that Taylor Swift's album Fearless and Flo Rida's single "Right Round" are the top-selling album and single, respectively, of the first half of the year.
July 6 – Ryan Ross and Jon Walker leave Panic! at the Disco and go on to form The Young Veins.
July 6–12 – Australian Radio station Triple J holds its 'Hottest 100 of All Time' with Nirvana's "Smells Like Teen Spirit" coming in first for the third consecutive time a 'Hottest 100 of All Time' has been held 1991, 1998 and 2009. This is the largest music poll in the world with more than half a million people voting.
July 6 — Lady Gaga releases the final single from her debut album, "Paparazzi". The song was performed on September 13 on the 2009 MTV Video Music Awards.
July 7 – A public memorial event for Michael Jackson is held at the Staples Center. Artists such as Stevie Wonder, Usher, Mariah Carey, Jennifer Hudson, John Mayer, Lionel Richie, Shaheen Jafargholi, and his brother, Jermaine Jackson performed.
July 9–12 – 10th EXIT festival takes place in the Petrovaradin Fortress of Novi Sad, Serbia, with more than 190,000 visitors.
July 10 – August 15 – Rockstar Energy Mayhem Festival, headlined by Marilyn Manson and Slayer
July 13 – Lady Gaga becomes the first performer to have three songs from a debut album reach No. 1 on an American Billboard chart since Fergie.
July 16-19 – Rock Fest
July 17-21 – Paul McCartney performs three sold-out concerts at Citi Field to open the stadium with opening act, The Script. This is because on August 15, 1965, The Beatles performed the first concert at Shea Stadium and McCartney joined Billy Joel on stage a year ago for the last concert there. Joel joined McCartney again on the first night.
July 21 – Shortlist announced for the 2009 Mercury Prize.
July 22-25 – 2009 10,000 Lakes Festival
July 24 – Blink-182 start their reunion tour, Blink-182 in Concert, with Fall Out Boy and Weezer. 
July 25–26 – Indietracks Festival, Derbyshire, UK
 The Splendour in the Grass music festival is held in Byron Bay, Australia, headlined by Bloc Party and The Flaming Lips.
July 30 – Justice Peter Jacobson of the Federal Court of Australia makes a preliminary ruling that Larrikin did own copyright on the song "Down Under", but the issue of whether or not Men At Work had plagiarised the riff was set aside to be determined at a later date.[22]

August
August 7–9 – Lollapalooza 2009
August 14–16 – Bloodstock Open Air Festival, Derbyshire, UK
August 20–22 – Hip Hop Kemp in Hradec Králové, Czech Republic
August 21 – Vocalist Jim Lindberg announces his departure from Pennywise.
August 21–23 – The Green Festival in New Brunswick, Canada
August 28 – After another fight with his brother Liam, Noel Gallagher leaves Oasis. Initial reports shortly afterwards suggested that Oasis had broken up, but Liam later stated that they have not broken up. The remaining members of Oasis eventually decide to discontinue the band name and start recording under a new name, Beady Eye.
August 28–31
 Greenbelt Festival in Cheltenham, UK
 The Black Eyed Peas Malaysian concert in celebration of beer giant Guinness's 250th anniversary in Kuala Lumpur is restricted to only non-Muslims since the sponsor is an alcoholic brand and it is considered inappropriate for Muslims to attend the concert which scheduled in September.
August 30 – ICS Vortex & Mustis are fired from Dimmu Borgir.

September
September 3 – Michael Jackson is entombed at Forest Lawn Memorial Park, Glendale, in a private family ceremony.
September 8 – Winner of the 2009 Mercury Prize announced.
September 9 
 The entire catalogue of The Beatles is re-released as digital remasters with rare pictures, short documentaries, original and newly written liner notes with replicated original UK artwork for the first time since 1987.
"Obsessed" by Mariah Carey enters the top ten and peaks at #7 on Billboard's Hot 100. The track is Carey's 27th top ten hit, lifting her into a three-way tie for fifth-most top 10s since the Hot 100 launched in 1958. She also tied with Janet Jackson for second-place among women. "Obsessed" was the lead single from her 12th studio album, Memoirs of an Imperfect Angel, and went on to be certified platinum by the end of the year.
September 12 – The first ever outdoor Sunset Strip Music Festival is held in West Hollywood, featuring performances from more than fifty bands including Ozzy Osbourne and Korn.
September 13 – At the 2009 MTV Video Music Awards, held in New York City at Radio City Music Hall, Lady Gaga, Beyoncé and Green Day win three awards. During Taylor Swift's acceptance speech for Best Female Video, Kanye West walks on stage and interrupts her saying that Beyoncé had one of the greatest videos of all time. 
September 16 – The Spice Girls reunite for dinner and drinks in London except for Victoria (Posh Spice), who was in Los Angeles. It was the first time all four Spice Girls reunited in public since their "Return of the Spice Girls Tour" in 2007/8. This 'public reunion' sparked rumours that the girls would reform again. 
September 17
Avril Lavigne and husband Deryck Whibley split after three years of marriage.VH1 Divas returns after a five-year absence with appearances by Kelly Clarkson, Jordin Sparks, Jennifer Hudson, Leona Lewis, Adele, and Miley Cyrus with host Paula Abdul
September 21
Genesis release the fourth of 5 planned box sets, Genesis Live 1973-2007.
Winner of the 2009 Polaris Music Prize announced.
Sugababes singer Keisha Buchanan leaves the group, surrounding days of speculation that arguments had occurred in the band. 2009 Eurovision song contest entrant Jade Ewen replaced her, leaving no members of the group's original lineup remaining.
September 24 – Chiodos fires their lead singer, Craig Owens.
September 25–27 – The inaugural Rotor Festival for Contemporary Music, an initiative of the International Music Institute (IMD) and the Ensemble Modern, is held in Frankfurt am Main, featuring music by Iannis Xenakis and Helmut Lachenmann, amongst others.
September 30 – Kylie Minogue kicks off her first-ever US Tour, in Oakland, California.

October
October 2 – Beyoncé Knowles is named Woman of 2009 by Billboard.
October 2–4 – Austin City Limits 2009
October 6 - The Backstreet Boys release their 7th/6th album This Is Us, their second and final album as a quartet
October 15 – Britney Spears's "3" debuted at number one on Billboard Hot 100. This is her third number one on Billboard Hot 100 and the first non-American Idol related single to debut at number one since Lauryn Hill's "Doo Wop (That Thing)" occupied the penthouse on November 14, 1999.
October 27 — Rihanna releases her first single on her album, Rated R, "Russian Roulette". It addresses her fight with Chris Brown.
October 28 – Michael Jackson's This Is It, featuring behind the scenes footage in the days before his death, is released. It enters the chart at No. 1, and becomes the best selling documentary of all time, raising over $250 million.

November
November 11 - The Country Music Association Awards will take place in Nashville, Tennessee from Bridgestone Arena. Brad Paisley and Carrie Underwood's second year hosting.
November 12 – Steven Tyler denies he is quitting Aerosmith, despite rumors that the band would be in need of a new lead singer.
November 16 – Genesis release the last of 5 planned box sets, Genesis Movie Box 1981-2007.
November 17
American rock band Fall Out Boy releases their first Believers Never Die - Greatest Hits compilation album and announce an indefinite hiatus shortly afterwards.
Canadian pop/R&B singer Justin Bieber becomes the first artist ever to have seven songs from a debut album chart on the Billboard Hot 100 when his debut album, My World is released.
November 22
The AMAs featured notable performances by Lady Gaga, Shakira, and Rihanna, but is most remembered for the performance by Adam Lambert of his debut single "For Your Entertainment".
Stan Walker is crowned the winner of the seventh and final season of Australian Idol, defeating Hayley Warner.

December
December 7 – Chris Brown makes a comeback by releasing his third studio album Graffiti months after he was charged for felony assault against female pop singer Rihanna.
December 11 – Garth Brooks came out of retirement for a solo acoustic show at the Encore Theater at Wynn Las Vegas.
December 13 – Lady Gaga becomes the first female artist in British chart history to achieve three number 1 singles in a single year, when her song "Bad Romance" reaches the top of the UK Singles Chart.
 Joe McElderry is named winner of the sixth series of The X Factor UK. Olly Murs is named runner-up, while Stacey Solomon and Danyl Johnson finish in third and fourth place respectively.
December 16 – John Frusciante announces his second departure from the Red Hot Chili Peppers.
December 20 – Rage Against the Machine takes the Christmas number one slot in the United Kingdom with "Killing in the Name", after a massive Facebook campaign.
December 22 – Per Eriksson & Niklas Sandin replace The Norrmans in Katatonia.

Bands formedSee Musical groups established in 2009Bands reformed
A1 (new album and tour)
Adema (original lineup reformed w/ Mark Chavez, new album and tour)
Bee Gees (announced live concerts)
Blink-182 (new album and tour)
Blue (summer tour since split in 2005)
Cinderella (band) (announced 2010 tour dates)
Cold (first album and tour since their split in 2006)
Cold Chisel
Creed (new album and tour)
The Cranberries (first tour since 2002)
Faith No More (touring only)
Far (New album and tour)
Frodus (new 7-inch EP and touring)
House Of Pain (touring)
Jairus (releasing album and touring)
Johnny Hates Jazz (first new album and tour since breakup in 1992)
Karma To Burn (touring only)
Mott the Hoople (touring only)
Mr. Big (touring only)
Mucky Pup (touring and new live CD & DVD releases)
Noise Addict (new album)
October Tide (new Album)
Phish (new album and tour)
Plastic Ono Band (first album under the name since 1975)
Public Image Ltd. (touring for 30th anniversary)
Saint Vitus (few shows only)
The Scene Aesthetic (new album and tour)
Screeching Weasel
Skunk Anansie (new single, greatest hits album and tour)
Spandau Ballet
Sublime (one-off performance)
The String Cheese Incident (one-off performance)
Sunny Day Real Estate (album reissues and tour)
Terrorizer
Tumbleweed (appearing at Homebake festival)
Underground Lovers (appearing at Homebake festival)
Wang Chung (new album and tour)
Wonderful Grand Band
The Jacksons

Returning performers
Alcazar (first studio album since 2003)
Alice in Chains (first studio album since 1995, and first release with William DuVall on vocals)
Amerie (first US studio album since 2005)
Baaba Maal (first studio album since 2001)
The Black Eyed Peas (first new album since 2005, after false rumors of breakup)
Blink-182 (first tour since 2004)
Blur (first performance since 2003)
Cave In (first recording since 2005)
Cher (continuing to perform in Las Vegas' Caesars Palace with her show Cher at the Colosseum).
Cornershop (first studio album since 2002)
Creed (first tour since 2004; first studio album since 2001)
Daughtry (first studio album since 2006)
The Dead (first tour since 2004)
Dave Matthews Band (first studio album since 2005, and first release following the death of saxophonist LeRoi Moore)
Depeche Mode (first studio album since 2005)
D.R.I. (first studio album since 1995)
Jadakiss (first studio album since 2004's Kiss of Death)
Josh Doyle (first studio recording since 2004; first tour since 2001)
Eminem (first studio album since 2004)
Face to Face (first studio album since 2002)
Flesh-N-Bone (first studio album since going to prison in 2000)
Galt Aureus (first studio album since 2006)
Green Day (first studio album since 2004)
Guano Apes (first tour since 2004)
Jello Biafra (new band, first non-talking album since 2005)
KISS (first studio album since 1998)
Limp Bizkit (first tour with original lineup since 2001)
Living Colour (first studio album since 2003)
Mandy Moore (first studio album since 2007)
Michael Jackson (first tour since 1997, but the tour was cancelled due to his sudden death)
Maxwell (first studio album since 2001)
Method Man & Redman (first studio album since 1999)
Mew (first studio album since 2005; first studio album recorded as a three-piece following the departure of Johan Wohlert)
The Mighty Mighty Bosstones (first all-new studio album since 2002)
The Offspring (first full-scale tour since 2005)
Old Man's Child (first album since 2005)
Pestilence (first album since 1993)
Polvo (first studio album since 1997, and first release with new drummer Brian Quast)
Kelly Price (first R&B album since 2003)
Rancid (first studio album since 2003, and first release with new drummer Branden Steineckert)
Ratt (first album since 1999)
Rusted Root (first studio album since 2002)
Hope Sandoval & the Warm Inventions (first studio album since 2001)
Shakira (first English studio album since 2005)
The Smashing Pumpkins (first studio album recorded without founding drummer Jimmy Chamberlin since 1998)
Snot (first album since 1997, and first release with Tommy "Vext" Cummings on vocals)
Spandau Ballet (first studio album since 1989)
Third Eye Blind (first studio album since 2003)
Thirty Seconds to Mars (first studio album since 2005)
 Titãs (first studio album since 2003)
Train (first studio album since 2006)
U2 (first studio album since 2004)
Whitney Houston (first studio album since 2003)

Bands disbandedSee Musical groups disestablished in 2009Bands on hiatus
 (+44)
 Bloc Party
 The Chicks
 Fall Out Boy (indefinite hiatus)
 Foo Fighters
 ¡Forward, Russia!
 Girls Aloud
 Nightmare of You
 Nine Inch Nails (Indefinite touring hiatus)
 The Pink Spiders
 P.O.D.
 The Pussycat Dolls
 Seemless
 Stereolab
 Sugarcult
 t.A.T.u.
 The Fratellis
 The Knife
 The Matches
 TV on the Radio
 Yellowcard (indefinite hiatus)

 Albums released 

Susan Boyle's album I Dreamed a Dream became the biggest selling album in the world for 2009, selling 8.3 million copies in five weeks of release.

Best-selling albums globally and in the U.S.

The best-selling records in 2009 in the world according to IFPI:

The best-selling records in 2009 in the US according to Nielsen Soundscan:

 Top hits on record in the world 

 Canada 
 "3" – Britney Spears (#1)
 "Circus" – Britney Spears (#2)
 "Heartless" – Kanye West (#8)
 "Hot n Cold" – Katy Perry (#1)
 "I Gotta Feeling" – The Black Eyed Peas (#1)
 "I Hate This Part" – The Pussycat Dolls (#5)
 "I'm Yours" – Jason Mraz (#3)
 "My Life Would Suck Without You" – Kelly Clarkson (#1)
 "Love Sex Magic" – Ciara featuring Justin Timberlake (#8)
 "Love Story" – Taylor Swift (#4)
 "LoveGame" – Lady Gaga (#2)
 "Paparazzi" – Lady Gaga (#3)
 "She Wolf" – Shakira (#5)
 "So What" – Pink (#1)
 "Sober" – Pink (#8)

 United Kingdom 
UK Official Top 75 No. 1 Hits
"Bad Boys" – Alexandra Burke featuring Flo Rida (1 week)
"Bad Romance"- Lady Gaga (1 week)
"Beat Again" – JLS (2 weeks)
"Boom Boom Pow" – The Black Eyed Peas (1 week)
"Boom Boom Pow" (second run) – The Black Eyed Peas (1 week)
"Bonkers" – Dizzee Rascal (2 week)
"Boys and Girls" – Pixie Lott (1 week)
"Break Your Heart" – Taio Cruz (3 weeks)
"Bulletproof" – La Roux (1 week)
"Evacuate the Dancefloor" – Cascada (2 weeks)
"Everybody In Love"- JLS (1 week)
"The Fear" – Lily Allen (4 weeks)
"Fight for This Love"- Cheryl Cole (2 weeks)
"Hallelujah" – Alexandra Burke (2 weeks in 2008/1 week in 2009)
"Holiday" – Dizzee Rascal (1 week)
"I Gotta Feeling" – The Black Eyed Peas (1 week)
"I Gotta Feeling" (second run) – The Black Eyed Peas (1 week)
"I'm Not Alone" – Calvin Harris (2 weeks)
"Islands in the Stream" – Rob Brydon and Ruth Jones ft. Robin Gibb and Tom Jones (1 week)
"Just Dance" featuring Colby O'Donis – Lady Gaga (3 weeks)
"Mama Do (Uh Oh Uh Oh)" – Pixie Lott (1 week)
"Meet Me Halfway"- The Black Eyed Peas (1 week)
"My Life Would Suck Without You" – Kelly Clarkson (1 week)
"Never Leave You" – Tinchy Stryder ft. Amelle (1 week)
"Number 1" – Tinchy Stryder ft. N-Dubz (3 weeks)
"The Official BBC Children in Need Medley"- Peter Kay's Animated All Star Band (2 weeks)
"Oopsy Daisy" – Chipmunk (1 week)
"Party in the U.S.A."- Miley Cyrus (1 week)
"Poker Face" – Lady Gaga (3 weeks)
"Right Round" – Flo Rida (1 week)
"Run This Town  – Jay-Z ft. Rihanna and Kanye West(1 week)
"Sexy Bitch" – David Guetta ft. Akon (1 week)
"When Love Takes Over" – David Guetta ft. Kelly Rowland (1 week)
"You Are Not Alone"- X Factor 2009 Finalists (1 week)

UK Official Top 75 Hits – Singles which have ranked within Top 20
"3" – Britney Spears (#7)
"Battlefield" – Jordin Sparks (#11)
"Behind Closed Doors" – Peter Andre (#4)
"Birthday Sex" – Jeremih (#15)
"Breathe Slow" – Alesha Dixon (#2)
"Broken Strings" – James Morrison featuring Nelly Furtado (#2)
"Candy" – Paolo Nutini (#19)
"Circus" – Britney Spears (#12)
"The Climb" – Miley Cyrus (#12)
"Day 'n' Nite" – Kid Cudi (#2)
"Diamond Rings" – Chipmunk ft. Emeli Sande (#6)
"Don't Upset The Rhythm" – Noisettes  (#2) 
"Down" – Jay Sean feat. Lil Wayne (#3)
"Fire" – Kasabian (#3)
"Fire Burning" – Sean Kingston (#12)
"Get On Your Boots" – U2 (#12)
"Get Sexy" – Sugababes (#2)
"Get Shaky" – The Ian Carey Project (#9)
"Greatest Day" – Take That (#10 – Hit No. 1 in 2008)
"Heartless" – Kanye West (#10)
"Hot n Cold" – Katy Perry (#4)
"Human" – The Killers (#3)
"Hush Hush; Hush Hush" – Pussycat Dolls (#18)
"I Hate This Part" – Pussycat Dolls (#20)
"I Know You Want Me (Calle Ocho)" – Pitbull (#4)
"I Need You Now" – Agnes (#40)
"I Remember" – Deadmau5 ft. Kaskade (#14)
"In for the Kill" – La Roux (#2)
"Issues" – The Saturdays (#4)
"Just Say Yes (song)" – Snow Patrol (#15)
"Kids" – MGMT (#16)
"Knock You Down" – Keri Hilson ft. Kanye West & Ne-Yo (#6)
"Left My Heart In Tokyo" – Mini Viva (#7)
"Let it Rock" – Kevin Rudolf featuring Lil Wayne (#5)
"Live Your Life" – T.I. featuring Rihanna (#2)
"Love Sex Magic" – Ciara featuring Justin Timberlake (#5)
"The Loving Kind" – Girls Aloud (#10)
"Mad" – Ne-Yo (#19)
"Never Forget You" – Noisettes (#20)
"New in Town" – Little Boots (#13)
"New Divide" – Linkin Park (#19)
"Not Fair" – Lily Allen  (#5) 
"Paparazzi" – Lady Gaga (#4)
"Poppiholla – Chicane" (#7)
"The Promise" – Girls Aloud (#15 – Hit No. 1 in 2008)
"Ready for the Weekend" – Calvin Harris ft. Mary Pearce (#3)
"Red" – Daniel Merriweather (#5)
"Release Me" – Agnes (#3)
"Remedy" – Little Boots (#5)
"Party in the U.S.A." – Miley Cyrus (#6)
"Run" – Leona Lewis (#2 – Hit No. 1 in 2008)
"Sex on Fire" – Kings of Leon (#6 – Hit No. 1 in 2008)
"She Wolf" – Shakira (#4)
"Single Ladies (Put a Ring on It)" – Beyoncé (#7)
"So What" – Pink (#17 – Hit No. 1 in 2008)
"Sober" – Pink (#9)
"Stone Cold Sober" – Paloma Faith  (#17) 
"Supernova" – Mr Hudson ft. Kanye West (#2)
"Sweet Disposition" – The Temper Trap (#15)
"Sweet Dreams" – Beyoncé (#5)
"Take Me Back" – Tinchy Stryder featuring Taio Cruz (#3)
"Tiny Dancer (Hold Me Closer)" – Ironik ft. Chipmunk  (#3) 
"Ulysses" – Franz Ferdinand (#20)
"Untouchable" – Girls Aloud (#11)
"Untouched" – The Veronicas (#8)
"Uprising" – Muse (#9)
"Use Somebody" – Kings of Leon (#2)
"Warrior's Dance" – The Prodigy (#9)
"We Are Golden" – Mika (#4)
"What About Now" – Daughtry (#11)
"What About Now" – Westlife (#2)
"Womanizer" – Britney Spears (#3)

 United States 
Billboard Hot 100 No. 1 Hits
 "3" – Britney Spears (1 week)
 "Boom Boom Pow" – The Black Eyed Peas (12 weeks)
 "Crack a Bottle" – Eminem featuring Dr. Dre and 50 Cent (1 week)
 "Down" – Jay Sean featuring Lil Wayne (2 weeks)
 "Empire State of Mind" – Jay-Z featuring Alicia Keys (5 weeks)
 "Fireflies" – Owl City (2 weeks)
 "I Gotta Feeling" – The Black Eyed Peas (14 weeks)
 "Just Dance" – Lady Gaga featuring Colby O'Donis (3 weeks)
 "My Life Would Suck Without You" – Kelly Clarkson (2 weeks)
 "Poker Face" – Lady Gaga (1 week)
 "Right Round" – Flo Rida featuring Ke$ha (6 weeks)
 "Single Ladies (Put a Ring on It)" – Beyoncé (2 weeks in 2008, 2 weeks in 2009)
 "Whatcha Say" – Jason Derülo (1 week)

Billboard Hot 100 Hits – Singles which have ranked within Top 20

Billboard Year-End Hot 100 singles of 2009

Classical musicSee 2009 in classical musicOpera
Operas which premiered in 2009 include:Kepler by Philip Glass, September 20, Landesthater Linz, AustriaAquarius by Karel Goeyvaerts, June 9, AntwerpThe Letter by Paul Moravec, July 25, Santa Fe OperaSparkie: Cage and Beyond by Michael Nyman, with Carsten NicolaiBrief Encounter by André Previn, May 1, Houston Grand OperaThe Lunch Box by Thanapoom Sirichang, March 26, Hobart, TasmaniaPrima Donna by Rufus Wainwright, July, Palace Theatre, Manchester

Musical films
 Jonas Brothers: The 3D Concert Experience premiered on February 27, 2009.Música en esperaMichael Jackson's This Is It premiered on October 28, 2009.NotoriousZanzibar Musical Club''

Deaths

January–February
January 2 – Valentina Giovagnini, 28, Italian singer (car crash)
January 6 – Ron Asheton, 60, American guitarist (The Stooges)
January 8 – Lamya al Mugheiry, 35, African singer
January 9 – Dave Dee, 67, British singer (Dave Dee, Dozy, Beaky, Mick & Tich)
January 12 – Alejandro Sokol, 48, Argentine rock musician
January 13 – Mansour Rahbani, 83, Lebanese composer
January 14 – Angela Morley, 84, English conductor and composer
January 15 – Veronica Dudarova, 92, Russian symphony conductor
January 18 – João Aguardela, 39, Portuguese rock singer, musician and composer
January 28 – Billy Powell, 56, American keyboardist (Lynyrd Skynyrd)
January 29 – John Martyn, 60, British singer/songwriter
January 31 – Dewey Martin, 68, Canadian drummer (Buffalo Springfield)
February 1 – Lukas Foss, 86, American pianist, conductor and composer
February 2 – Sunny Skylar, 95, American songwriter
February 3
Tom Brumley, 73, American steel guitarist (The Buckaroos)
Kurt Demmler, 65, German songwriter
February 4 – Lux Interior, 62, American singer (The Cramps)
February 7
Blossom Dearie, 82, American jazz singer and pianist
Jorge Reyes, 56, Mexican musician (Chac Mool)
February 9 – Vic Lewis, 89, British jazz guitarist
February 11 – Estelle Bennett, 67, American singer (The Ronettes)
February 12
Mat Mathews, 84, Dutch jazz accordionist
Coleman Mellett, 34, American guitarist 
Gerry Niewood, 65, American jazz saxophonist
February 14
Louie Bellson, 84, American jazz drummer
John McGlinn, 55, American conductor and historian of musicals
February 15 – Joe Cuba, 78, Puerto Rican jazz percussionist
February 18 – Snooks Eaglin, 72, American guitarist and singer
February 19
Kelly Groucutt, 63, British bass guitar player (Electric Light Orchestra)
Harrison Ridley Jr., 70, American jazz presenter
Miika Tenkula, 34, Finnish guitar player (Sentenced)
February 20 – Fats Sadi, 81, Belgian jazz musician, vocalist and composer
February 24
Svatopluk Havelka, 83, Czech composer
Pearl Lang, 87, American dancer and choreographer
February 25 – Randall Bewley, 53, American guitarist (Pylon)

March–April
March 1 – Joan Turner, 86, British singer and actress
March 2 – Ernie Ashworth, 80, American country singer
March 3 – Sydney Earle Chaplin, 82, American actor and singer
March 4 – John Cephas, 78, American Piedmont blues guitarist
March 5 – Edmund Hockridge, 79, Canadian singer and actor
March 6
Francis Magalona, 44, Filipino actor and rapper
Henri Pousseur, 79, Belgian composer
March 7 – Jimmy Boyd, 70, American singer
March 14 – Alain Bashung, 61, French singer/songwriter and actor
March 18 – Kent Henry, 60, American blues/rock guitarist
March 22 – Reg Isidore, 59, Aruban drummer (Robin Trower Band)
March 24 – Uriel Jones, 74, Motown Funk Brothers session drummer
March 25 – "England" Dan Seals, 61, American singer-songwriter (mantle cell lymphoma)
March 29 – Maurice Jarre, 84, French composer
April 9 – Randy Cain, 63, singer, (The Delfonics)
April 13 – Ron Stallings, saxophonist (Huey Lewis and the News)

May–June
May 6 – Ean Evans, 48, American bass guitarist
May 13 – Rafael Escalona, 81, Colombian vallenato composer and performer
May 15 – Wayman Tisdale, 44, NBA basketball player and smooth jazz bass guitarist
May 18
Wayne Allwine, 62, American voice artist (Mickey Mouse)
Roderick "Dolla" Burton II, 21, American rapper
May 24 – Jay Bennett, 45, American multi-instrumentalist (Wilco)
June 3 – Koko Taylor, 80, American blues singer
June 7 
Hugh Hopper, 64, English progressive rock and jazz fusion bass guitarist
Kenny Rankin, 69 American pop and jazz musician
June 14 – Bob Bogle, 75, American guitarist (The Ventures)
June 18 – Ali Akbar Khan, 87, Indian sarod player
June 25
Michael Jackson, 50, American entertainer.
Sky Saxon, 63, American rock singer and bass guitarist (The Seeds)
June 27 – Fayette Pinkney, 61, American singer (The Three Degrees)
June 30 – Harve Presnell, 75, American singer and actor

July–August
July 2 – Susan Fernandez, 52, Filipina activist and singer
July 4 
Jim Chapin, American drummer, 89
Allen Klein, 77, American record label executive
Drake Levin, 62, American guitarist (Paul Revere & the Raiders) 
July 8 – Midnight, 47, American singer-songwriter (Crimson Glory) 
July 11 – Angie Pirog, 18, Canadian folk singer/guitarist
July 16 – D. K. Pattammal, 90, Indian classical singer
July 17 – Gordon Waller, 64, British singer (Peter and Gordon)
July 21
Andrew Thomas, 63, German singer (Bad Boys Blue)
Gangubai Hangal, 96, Indian classical singer
Marcel Jacob, 45, Swedish bassist
July 26 – Merce Cunningham, 90, American dancer, choreographer
July 27 – George Russell, 86, American composer
July 31 – Titus "Baatin" Glover, 61, American singer (Slum Village)
August 6 – Willy DeVille, 58, American musician
August 12 – Rashied Ali, 74, American drummer
August 13 – Les Paul, 94, American jazz guitarist and inventor of solid-body electric guitar and multi-track recording
August 14 – Gates Nichols, 65, American steel guitarist (Confederate Railroad)
August 18 – Hildegard Behrens, 72, German opera singer
August 28 – DJ AM, 36, American turntabalist and celebrity disc jockey (Crazy Town)

September–October
September 1 – Erich Kunzel, 74, American conductor
September 7 – Fred Mills, 74, Canadian trumpeter
September 11 – Jim Carroll, 60, American writer and punk singer (Jim Carroll Band)
September 16 – Mary Travers, 72, American folk singer (Peter, Paul and Mary)
September 17 – Leon Kirchner, 90, American composer
September 19 – Roc Raida, 37, American turntablist (The X-Ecutioners)
September 24 – Sir Howard Morrison, 74, New Zealand entertainer
October 4 – Mercedes Sosa, 74, Argentinian singer
October 5 – Mike Alexander, 32, British bassist (Evile)
October 7 – Steve Ferguson, 60, American rock guitarist (NRBQ)
October 9 – Arturo Cavero, 68, Peruvian singer
October 10 – Stephen Gately, 33, Irish pop singer (Boyzone)
October 12
Dickie Peterson, 61, American bassist (Blue Cheer)
Ian Wallace, 90, British singer
October 13 – Al Martino, 82, American singer
October 17 – Vic Mizzy, 93, American composer
October 28 – Taylor Mitchell, 19, Canadian folk singer-songwriter

November–December
November 8 – Jerry Fuchs, 34, American drummer (!!!, Maserati)
November 15 – Derek B, 44, British rapper
November 22 – Haydain Neale, 39, Canadian soul/R&B singer (jacksoul)
December 2 – Eric Woolfson, 64, Scottish musician (The Alan Parsons Project)
December 4 – Liam Clancy, 74, Irish Musician (The Clancy Brothers and Tommy Makem)
December 9 – Faramarz Payvar, 76, composer and santur player
December 20 – James Gurley, 69, American musician (Big Brother and the Holding Company)
December 25 – Vic Chesnutt, 45, American musician
December 28 – James "The Rev" Sullivan, 28, American drummer (Avenged Sevenfold)
December 30 – Rowland S. Howard, 50, Australian guitarist (The Birthday Party)

References

External links
Germany Top 100 Singles – 2009

 
2009-related lists
Music-related lists
Music by year